Joel Stelly (born January 13, 1984) is a former American football player who most recently played for the Chicago Bears of the National Football League. He attended Cecilia High School and the University of Louisiana at Monroe, where he spent his collegiate football career as place kicker and punter. Stelly is a Louisiana native, spending his youth in Lafayette, Louisiana.

Professional career
The Chicago Bears acquired Stelly around the 2006 season. He spent some time at the Bears' spring training camp, and was then relocated to NFL Europa for development. He was cut before the start of the 2007 season in favor of veteran punter Brad Maynard.

External links
 NFL.com Profile
 Louisiana–Monroe Warhawks bio

1984 births
Living people
Sportspeople from Lafayette, Louisiana
American football punters
Louisiana–Monroe Warhawks football players
Chicago Bears players
Cologne Centurions (NFL Europe) players